Indian Creek is a stream in  Texas County, Missouri. It is a tributary of the Big Piney River.

The stream source is south of Missouri Route 17 west of Yukon. It flows west-northwest passing under U. S. Route 63 south of Houston and enters the Big Piney southwest of Houston.

Indian Creek took its name from an old Shawnee Indian settlement near its course.

See also
List of rivers of Missouri

References

Rivers of Texas County, Missouri
Rivers of Missouri
Tributaries of the Gasconade River